The 2006–07 Macedonian Football Cup was the 15th season of Macedonia's football knockout competition. FK Makedonija Gjorche Petrov were the defending champions, having won their first title. The 2006–07 champions were FK Vardar who won their fifth title.

Competition calendar

First round
Matches were played on 30 July 2006.

|colspan="3" style="background-color:#97DEFF" align=center|30 July 2006

|}
1Interrupted at 0–2. Match awarded to Shkëndija 79.

Second round
The draw was held on 18 August 2006 in Skopje. The first legs were played on 20 September and second were played on 18 October 2006.

|}

Quarter-finals
The draw was held on 20 October 2006 in Skopje. The first legs were played on 1 November and second were played on 29 November 2006.

|}

Semi-finals
The draw was held on 5 December 2006 in Skopje. The first legs were played on 11 April and the second on 2 May 2007.

Summary

|}

Matches

Pobeda won 3–1 on aggregate.

Vardar won 3–2 on aggregate.

Final

See also
2006–07 Macedonian First Football League
2006–07 Macedonian Second Football League

External links
 2006–07 Macedonian Football Cup at rsssf.org
 2006–07 Macedonian Football Cup at FFM.mk

Macedonia
Cup
Macedonian Football Cup seasons